Sophia Skou (born 1 December 1975 in Copenhagen) is a Danish former butterfly swimmer, who twice competed in the Summer Olympics for her native country: in 1996 and 2000.

Skou was Denmark's leading swimmer in the 1990s, together with Mette Jacobsen. Skou was mainly successful in the short course (25m) events, although she won the bronze medal in the 200m butterfly at the European LC Championships 1995 in Vienna, Austria.

External links
Profile on FINA-website

1975 births
Living people
Danish female butterfly swimmers
Olympic swimmers of Denmark
Swimmers at the 1996 Summer Olympics
Swimmers at the 2000 Summer Olympics
Medalists at the FINA World Swimming Championships (25 m)
European Aquatics Championships medalists in swimming
Swimmers from Copenhagen